Demequina litorisediminis is a Gram-positive, facultatively anaerobic and non-spore-forming bacterium from the genus Demequina which has been isolated from tidal flat sediments from the Yellow Sea in Korea.

References

External links
Type strain of Demequina litorisediminis at BacDive -  the Bacterial Diversity Metadatabase

Micrococcales
Bacteria described in 2016